The Northern Lawn Tennis Club, or simply The Northern, is a members-owned sporting club in West Didsbury, Manchester. It was home to the prestigious Northern Championships considered one of the most important tournaments in the world for many years. the others being Wimbledon, the U.S. National championships and the Irish Championships It is now the venue for the Manchester Trophy (the  successor to that former event), is played on the International Tennis Federation (ITF) Women's Circuit.

History
The club was established in December 1881 in nearby Old Trafford on grounds leased from the De Trafford Estate. Initial membership was limited to 250 people who had to pay one guinea entrance fee as well as one guinea subscription. In 1909 the club moved to its current location in Didsbury. Over the years the club has hosted many international tournaments including the Manchester Open, which started in 1880 as the Northern Lawn Tennis Championships, and the current Manchester Trophy on the ITF Women's Circuit and formerly part of the ATP Challenger Tour. The club has hosted many players including Ken Rosewall, Maureen Connolly, Pete Sampras and Martina Navratilova.

Facilities
The club is a member of the Lawn Tennis Association and has facilities offering 22 tennis courts: three indoor courts, nine grass courts, three clay courts, six synthetic tiger turf, an indoor half wall and a junior court. In a normal season, outdoor play will commence on the grass courts around the second week in May and finish around the second week of September. 

It also has large squash facilities: six courts in total and is an affiliated member of England Squash & Racketball. There is also a gym on site with fitness classes and a bar and restaurant area.

Notable tournaments 

 Northern Championships

 Manchester Open 
 Rothmans Northern Open

 Greater Manchester Grass Court Championships
 All England Ladies Doubles Championship

References

Further reading

External links
 Official website
 Lawn Tennis Association (LTA) – Northern Lawn Tennis Club
 Manchester City Council directory listing

Tennis venues in the United Kingdom
Tennis venues in England
Sport in Manchester
Tennis clubs